David Schickele (March 20, 1937 – October 31, 1999) was an American musician, film director and actor.

He was born in Ames, Iowa to Alsatian immigrant parents. His father, Rainer, was the son of writer René Schickele. His brother Peter Schickele is a musician and parodist. He grew up in Fargo, North Dakota and then studied English literature at Swarthmore College. In 1961, he joined the Peace Corps and started teaching English language in Nigeria. When he returned to the U.S., he made a film about the Peace Corps titled Give Me a Riddle (1966). In 1971, he directed his second film Bushman and in 1992, his last film Tuscarora was released.

In 1978, he contributed some music to Northern Lights, a film by Rob Nilsson whom he met during his time in Nigeria. He later starred in two of his films, Signal Seven and Heat and Sunlight. He also starred in seven movies directed by Bobby Roth – Dead Solid Perfect (1988), Keeper of the City (1991), The Switch (1992), Judgment Day: The John List Story (1993), Ride with the Wind (1993), Kidnapped: In the Line of Duty (1995), and Naomi & Wynonna: Love Can Build a Bridge (1995). In 1979, he received the  Guggenheim Fellowship.

He died in San Francisco at the age of 62.

References

External links

American male violinists
American male film actors
Film directors from Iowa
People from Ames, Iowa
1937 births
1999 deaths
Deaths from cancer in California
20th-century American male musicians
20th-century American male actors
Male actors from Iowa
Peace Corps volunteers
20th-century American violinists
Musicians from Iowa